Amal Athulathmudali (born 21 January 1987) is a Sri Lankan first-class cricketer who plays for Badureliya Sports Club.

References

External links
 

1987 births
Living people
Sri Lankan cricketers
Badureliya Sports Club cricketers
Chilaw Marians Cricket Club cricketers
Cricketers from Colombo